Achille Guenée (sometimes M.A. Guenée; 1 January 1809 – 30 December 1880) was a French lawyer and entomologist.

Biography
Achille Guenée was born in Chartres and died in Châteaudun.

He was educated in Chartres, where he showed a very early interest in butterflies and was encouraged and taught by François de Villiers (1790–1847). He went to study law in Paris, then entered the “Bareau”. After the death of his only son, he lived at Châteaudun in Chatelliers. During the Franco-Prussian War of 1870, Châteaudun was burned by the Prussians but Guénée's collections remained intact.

He was the author of 63 publications, some with Philogène Auguste Joseph Duponchel (1774–1846). He notably wrote Species des nocturnes  (Night Species in English) (six volumes, 1852–1857) forming parts of the Suites à Buffon. This work of almost 1,300 pages treats Noctuidae of the world. Also co-author, with Jean Baptiste Boisduval, of Histoire naturelle des Insectes. Species général des Lépidoptères (vols 5–10, 1836–57).

He was a founding member 1832 of the Société Entomologique de France, (1832) and was president in 1848 then honorary member in 1874. He was among the first to describe the Cadra calidella species.

References

Edward Oliver Essig (1931). In History of Entomology. Mac Millan (New York): vii + 1029 p. 
Jean Gouillard (2004). History of the French entomologists, 1750–1950. Entirely re-examined and increased edition. Boubée (Paris): 287 p. 
Jean Lhoste (1987). French Entomologists. 1750–1950. INRA Editions: 351 p.

French entomologists
French taxonomists
Presidents of the Société entomologique de France
1809 births
1880 deaths
People from Chartres
19th-century French zoologists